Fragments of an Untold Story Born by Shunning the Opportunity is the debut from Philadelphia hardcore band This Day Forward.  It was recorded before Vadim Taver joined the band.

Track listing
 Kissing Perfections Cheek (3:03)
 Dead Acres (4:21) 
 Arise (2:50) 
 Kill the Script (5:05)
 I Repent (2:40) 
 Significant Others (3:39)
 Avarice (3:40)
 Lost Eyes (2:56)
 If I Wore a Mask (4:32) 
 Ripple Effect (5:12)

Facts
 The album's title derives from a lyric in "If I Wore a Mask".
"Kissing Perfection's Cheek", "If I Wore a Mask" and "Significant Others" were re-recorded later for their follow-up album, The Transient Effects of Light on Water.
 The band re-released the album on Eulogy Recordings after originally releasing it on Break Even Records. The band thought it was a good decision at the moment but ended up regretting it because they "all hate that record." The reasoning behind this, says guitarist Vadim Taver in an interview with silentstagnation.de "Because those songs were written 4-5 years ago. The kind of music it is, is not what the band is feeling right now. We're not a mosh-metalcore band anymore. That's what we were in high school. Most of those songs are horribly written."

References

1999 albums
This Day Forward albums